Timo Kastening (born 25 June 1995) is a German handball player for MT Melsungen and the German national team.

He represented Germany at the 2020 European Men's Handball Championship. and the 2021 World Men's Handball Championship

References

External links

1995 births
Living people
German male handball players
People from Stadthagen
Handball-Bundesliga players
Handball players at the 2020 Summer Olympics
Sportspeople from Lower Saxony